The Year of the Flood is a 2004 romantic drama film directed by Jaime Chávarri based on the novel of the same name by Eduardo Mendoza which stars Fanny Ardant and Darío Grandinetti.

Plot 
Set in a Catalan village in 1953, the plot follows the romantic relationship between Sor Consuelo, a nun, and Don Augusto Aixelá, a womanizing local landholder. The entry of the Maquis guerrilla on the scene disrupts the plight of Consuelo.

Cast

Production 
A joint Spanish-French-Italian co-production, the film was produced by GONA alongside Oberon Cinematográfica, Babe and Kairòs. Shooting began on 11 August 2003 and wrapped in October 2003. Shooting locations included Barcelona and neighbouring villages.

Release 
Penned by Eduardo Mendoza and Jaime Chávarri, the screenplay is an adaptation of the 1992 novel of the same name authored by the former. The film screened in April 2004 at the Málaga Film Festival's main competition. Distributed by United International Pictures, it was theatrically released in Spain on 28 April 2004.

Accolades 

|-
| align = "center" | 2005 || 19th Goya Awards || Best Adapted Screenplay || Eduardo Mendoza, Jaime Chávarri ||  || 
|}

See also 
 List of Spanish films of 2004

Informational notes

References 

Films set in Catalonia
Films shot in Catalonia
Films set in 1953
Spanish romantic drama films
French romantic drama films
Italian romantic drama films
Films about the Spanish Maquis
Films based on Spanish novels
2000s Spanish-language films
2004 romantic drama films
Films directed by Jaime Chávarri
2000s French films
2000s Spanish films
2000s Italian films
Films about Catholic nuns